Oren Jacoby is a director and producer of documentary films including; Shadowman (2017), My Italian Secret: The Forgotten Heroes (2014), Lafayette: The Lost Hero(2010), Constantine's Sword (2008), Sister Rose's Passion (2005), The Shakespeare Sessions (2003), Stage on Screen: The Topdog Diaries (2002), The Beatles Revolution (2000), and Sam Shepard: Stalking Himself (1998). His stage adaptation of Ralph Ellison's Invisible Man premiered in 2012 at the Court Theater in Chicago, starring Teagle Bougere.

Life and career
Jacoby was educated at Brown University and Yale University. He has been an independent filmmaker since 1992, and was nominated for an Academy Award for Best Documentary Short Subject in 2005 for Sister Rose's Passion, which also won Best Documentary Short Film at the 2004 Tribeca Film Festival. He has written, directed, and produced award-winning films for three decades. His work has been recognized by the American Film Institute, the Alfred I. DuPont / Columbia awards,  the MacArthur Foundation, the Sundance Institute, ITVS, Britain’s Royal Television Society, and by the Oscars. His films have appeared on the BBC, HBO Cinemax, PBS, National Geographic, VH-1, NHK, Bloomberg TV and Arté, as well as Nokia, Verizon, and Human Rights Watch websites. He created and was the executive producer as well as a director and writer for the six-part documentary TV series Risk Takers (2011–12).
  
In September 2014, he released My Italian Secret: The Forgotten Heroes, a feature-length documentary about unsung heroes in World War II Italy.
Jacoby’s stage adaptation of Ralph Ellison’s Invisible Man was produced in Washington and Boston in 2012–13. It won a Jefferson Award for best New Play adaptation and 4 Helen Hayes Awards in 2013.

Shadowman, a film about the life of Richard Hambleton was screened in the Tribeca Film Festival April 21, 2017. The film came in second place for the Tribeca Audience Award.

Topdog Diaries about the Pulitzer prize-winning playwright, Suzan-Lori Parks, featured Don Cheadle and Jeffrey Wright; The Shakespeare Sessions starred Kevin Kline, Cynthia Nixon, Liev Schreiber, and Charles S. Dutton. Jacoby also made: Swingin’ with Duke, a celebration of Duke Ellington's centennial featuring Wynton Marsalis; Master Thief on the "art heist of the century"; Benny Goodman: Adventures in the Kingdom of Swing for American Masters and The Second Russian Revolution, a behind-the-scenes investigation of the collapse of the USSR, called "the best BBC series of the decade" by the London Independent. Jacoby also wrote, produced and directed The Return Ticket, adapted from a short story by Anton Chekhov; The Last Girl on Earth, Ghosts of the Bayou and Idols of the Game, featuring Michael Jordan.

Jacoby has directed plays at Theater for the New City, the Williamstown Theater Festival, Ensemble Studio Theater, the West Bank Cafe and regional theaters, including new works by Richard Dresser, Quincy Long, Botho Strauss, and Franz Xavier Kroetz as well as classics by Molière, Chekhov, and Pirandello.

He is married to fellow documentary filmmaker Betsy West.

References

External links

Oren Jacoby at Charlie Rose

American film directors
Living people
Year of birth missing (living people)
American documentary filmmakers
Brown University alumni
Yale University alumni
American theatre directors